Enterocloster clostridioformis, formerly known as Clostridium clostridioforme,  is an anaerobic, motile, Gram-positive bacterium.

Description 
E. clostridioformis are rod-shaped bacteria which cannot grow in the presence of oxygen. While Clostridium species have cell walls that resemble gram-positive bacteria, E. clostridioformis often appears negative by Gram stain.

History 
The organism now classified as E. clostridioformis was first identified in the 1950s in human and animal feces and assigned to the genus of Gram-negative non-spore-forming bacteria Bacteroides. In subsequent years, these bacteria were shown to form spores, causing them to be reclassified in the genus Clostridium. Most recently this species has been reclassified as E. clostridioformis based on phylogeny.

References

External links

Type strain of Clostridium clostridioforme at BacDive -  the Bacterial Diversity Metadatabase

Lachnospiraceae
Bacteria described in 1906